The final of the Men's Hammer Throw event at the 2003 Pan American Games took place on Thursday August 7, 2003. The title went to Argentina's Juan Ignacio Cerra, who set a distance of 75.53 metres in his sixth and final attempt. America's John McEwen later was disqualified due to a doping offence. His bronze medal went to number four in the rankings, Cuba's Yosvany Suárez.

Medalists

Records

Results

Notes

See also
2003 World Championships in Athletics – Men's hammer throw
2003 Hammer Throw Year Ranking
Athletics at the 2004 Summer Olympics – Men's hammer throw

References
Results

Hammer, Men
2003